Medical Horizons is a public affairs television series, focusing on advancements in medical technology, which aired on ABC from September 12, 1955 to March 5, 1956. The program, broadcast live, sometimes offered surgical scenes as well as information about new medical equipment.

Fred Carney was the producer and Robert "Bob" Foster was the director. Jay Raeben of the J. Walter Thompson agency was the writer. Ciba Pharmaceutical Products, in cooperation with the American Medical Association, sponsored the program. The purpose of the program was to "bring to the attention of the public the contributions of the American health professions" (per "Cibascope," company newsletter, 1956).

Critical reception
A review of the November 14, 1955, episode in the trade publication Broadcasting found that broadcast lacking in interest. It began, "The dramatic and increasingly successful fight against tuberculosis managed to become a dull story ..." The review also contained the comment, "Lines intended to reflect spontaneity instead came out as clumsy and plodding ..."`

References

1955 American television series debuts
1956 American television series endings
1950s American documentary television series
Black-and-white American television shows
English-language television shows
American Broadcasting Company original programming